Johan Sverre may refer to:

 Johan Sverre (actor) (1923–1990), Norwegian actor
 Johan Sverre (sports official) (1867–1934), Norwegian sports official

See also
 Sverre